Gear Krieg is an alternate history game setting published by Dream Pod 9. It contains information suitable for role-playing and wargaming a pulp-fueled World War II, featuring walking tanks and epic tabletop battles.



Setting
Gear Krieg is an alternate history take on World War II, where the technology curve is a little more steep than in our own reality. Technology, such as personal jet packs, rocket fighters, and walking tanks, are developed during the course of the war, sometimes massively changing events and famous battles.

From the game's rulebook: "The world would indeed have been a different place had the Roaring Twenties not delivered the wonders promised by visionaries. Instead, war walkers now stride across the battlefield of Europe, huge supertanks thunder over North Africa, rocket fighters duel high above the Pacific, adventurers and superspies battle the Nazi forces in the shadows and scientists work feverishly in their laboratories to perfect the next doomsday weapon for their masters. Powered by advanced science, will the darkness of fascism spread across the world, or can brave men and women prevent it?"

Rules
Gear Krieg is based on the Silhouette game engine, a streamlined set of rules that is already described in Heavy Gear, Dream Pod 9's other science fiction game. It can be played as either a role-playing game (RPG), a tactical wargame, or an hybrid integration of both.

Both the RPG and miniature games are built on the same basic rule mechanics. Silhouette is a realistic, simulationist system that defines characters in terms of ten base attributes (agility, knowledge, etc.), 5 derived attributes (health, etc.), and a variety of skills. Skill rolls make up the backbone of the system, which focuses on effect-based speed of play over grainy detail. The core mechanic involves rolling a number of 6-sided dice, taking the highest result and comparing it to a set threshold number. If the result is higher than the threshold the test is a success; if it is lower the test is a failure. The margin by which the test succeeded (Margin of Success, MoS) or failed (Margin of Failure, MoF) helps to determine the final outcome. Combat is handled by the same system, with characters taking penalty-inflicting wounds rather than depleting a set number of health points. As a result, the system can be lethal, especially on inexperienced characters. To keep the proper pulp high-action atmosphere, the game includes rules that allow players to twist the odds in their favor, in keeping with the conventions of the adventure genre.

Publication history
Just as its support for Tribe 8 was starting to fade, Dream Pod 9 came out with their fourth RPG, Gear Krieg (2001), an alternate-history role-playing game set during World War II where technology was more advanced and thus the game featured technological anachronisms such as walking tanks. Like the company's earlier game Heavy Gear, Gear Krieg could be played either as a role-playing game or a tactical one.  The Silhouette CORE Rulebook (2003) offered a new standalone version of Silhouette that turned it into a generic system and also contained rules for converting d20 to Silhouette. The 'SilCORE' book – as it was called – was immediately followed by the Mecha Companion (2003), which offered d20 stats for all the mecha from Heavy Gear, Jovian Chronicles and Gear Krieg using Guardians of Order's d20 Mecha (2003) mech description rules.  The creation of the SilCORE book also allowed Dream Pod 9 to rerelease old games in dual d20 and Silhouette form, and the next year thus saw the release of Jovian Chronicles second edition (2003), Gear Krieg second edition (2003), Heavy Gear third edition (2003), Tribe 8 second edition (2004) and the brand new CORE Command (2003).

Reviews
Knights of the Dinner Table Magazine #49 (Nov., 2000)
Pyramid
Pyramid

References

External links
 Official Gear Krieg Site
 Dream Pod 9
 Fusion Models (Vehicle Designer)

Alternate history games
Dream Pod 9 games
Miniature wargames
Role-playing games about World War II alternate histories
Campaign settings
Pulp and noir period role-playing games
Wargames introduced in the 2000s